Maleč is a municipality and village in Havlíčkův Brod District in the Vysočina Region of the Czech Republic. It has about 600 inhabitants.

Administrative parts
Villages of Blatnice, Dolní Lhotka, Horní Lhotka, Hranice, Jeníkovec and Předboř are administrative parts of Maleč.

References

Villages in Havlíčkův Brod District